Don't Listen is a 2020 Spanish horror and supernatural thriller film directed by  in his feature film debut. Its cast features Rodolfo Sancho, Ana Fernández, Ramón Barea, and Belén Fabra, among others.

Plot 
Upon moving in a new home with their 9-year-old son Eric, Daniel and Sara are upended by psychophonies, first experienced by Eric and thus attributed by a psychologist to the kid's lack of stability and his own imagination. Seasoned parapsychologist Germán and his daughter Ruth (a sceptic sound engineer) turn in to provide help to Daniel.

Cast

Production 
The screenplay was penned by Santiago Díaz, based on an original story by Ángel Gómez and Víctor Gado. The film is a Feelgood Media, Kowalski Films, LaNube, and Estudio V production, with the participation of RTVE and Canal Sur, and support from ICAA. Shooting locations included Torrelodones.

Release 
Distributed by eOne Films Spain, the film was theatrically released in Spain on 24 July 2020.

Reception 
Chad Collins of Dread Central rated the film 4 out of 5 stars, assessing that "not every jump scare in Don't Listen works, but those that do work like gangbusters", with the film managing to be "gnarly and mean in ways that most haunted house movies aren't".

Daniel Quesada of HobbyConsolas rated the film 79 out of 100 points ("good"), considering that while it is clear that the film is not precisely inventing the wheel, it turns out to be a "great bet for summer terror and has the potential to be part of something bigger".

See also 
 List of Spanish films of 2020

References 

Spanish supernatural horror films
Spanish horror thriller films
2020 horror thriller films
2020s Spanish films
2020s Spanish-language films
Spanish haunted house films
Films shot in the Community of Madrid
Kowalski Films films
2020 directorial debut films